Spalding High School may refer to:

Spalding High School (Georgia), USA
Spalding High School, Lincolnshire, England
Spaulding High School (New Hampshire), USA
Spalding Institute, Illinois, USA
Archbishop Spalding High School, Maryland, USA

See also
Spaulding High School